Stephen Lynch may refer to:

Stephen Lynch (musician) (born 1971), American musician and comedian
Stephen Lynch fitz Dominick Dubh (fl. 1504–1523), mayor of Galway
Stephen Lynch (English cricketer) (born 1951)
Stephen Lynch (New Zealand cricketer) (born 1976)
Stephen Lynch (Franciscan), member of the Order of Saint Francis
Stephen Lynch (professor), Australian liver transplant surgeon
Stephen Andrew Lynch (1882–1969), motion picture industry pioneer
Stephen F. Lynch (born 1955), United States Representative from Massachusetts
Steve Lynch (born 1955), original lead guitarist for the band Autograph